Agononida tenuipes is a species of squat lobster in the family Munididae. It is found off of Japan.

References

Squat lobsters
Crustaceans described in 1967